is a Japanese manga series written and illustrated by Hideki Arai. It was serialized in Kodansha's seinen manga magazine Morning from 1990 to 1994, with its chapters collected in 12 tankōbon volumes. It was adapted into television drama that aired on TV Tokyo from April to June 2018, followed by a live action film which premiered in September 2019. In 1993, Miyamoto kara Kimi e won the 38th Shogakukan Manga Award in the general category.

Media

Manga
Written and illustrated by Hideki Arai, Miyamoto kara Kimi e was serialized in Kodansha's seinen manga magazine Morning from 1990 to 1994. Kodansha collected its chapters in twelve tankōbon volumes, released from July 19, 1991, to November 18, 1994; they republished in six volumes from September 20 to November 19, 1999. Ohta Publishing republished the series in a new edition of four volumes, under the title , from January 17 to April 16, 2009.

Drama
In March 2018, it was announced that the manga would receive a television drama adaptation. It was broadcast on TV Tokyo from April 7 to June 30, 2018.

Live-action film
The television drama series was followed by a live-action film, which premiered in Japan on September 27, 2019.

Reception
In 1993, alongside Ichimaru's Okami-san, Miyamoto kara Kimi e won the 38th Shogakukan Manga Award in the general category.

Notes

References

External links
  
 

Kodansha manga
Seinen manga
TV Tokyo original programming
Winners of the Shogakukan Manga Award for general manga
Japanese drama films